Mario Valentin Gallegos Jr. (September 8, 1950 – October 16, 2012) 
was an American Democratic politician in the U.S. state of Texas. He was the senator from District 6 in the Texas Senate, which serves a portion of Harris County.

Political career
Gallegos, who originated from the Magnolia Park community of Houston, was a long-time firefighter with the Houston Fire Department and retired as a Senior Captain after 22 years of service.  In 1990, he was elected to the 72nd Legislature in the Texas House of Representatives from District 143, where he served two terms, from 1991 to 1995.

In 1994, Representatives Gallegos and Yolanda Navarro Flores and former Representative Roman O. Martinez squared off in the Democratic primary for a recently redrawn Senate District 6. Martinez received a plurality of the votes and faced Gallegos in a runoff. Gallegos secured the endorsement of former opponent Flores and won, and with no other candidates for the Senate seat, Gallegos became the first Mexican American elected to that body from Harris County.

Gallegos faced no opposition in 1998 and was reelected to the Senate. In July 2001, Gallegos was named one of the worst legislators in Texas by Texas Monthly magazine in their biennial feature. The authors noted that Gallegos was "a retired firefighter who threw gasoline on every combustible issue," and noted his penchant for injecting race into seemingly innocuous legislation.

Gallegos was unopposed in 2002. However, in 2004, Gallegos was again challenged by Yolanda Navarro Flores in the Democratic primary. Amidst two separate lawsuits challenging his residency within District 6 boundaries, and revelations (and another lawsuit) regarding a 17-year affair with former stripper Susan Delgado, Gallegos won a close contest. In the 2004 general election, he faced Libertarian challenger Tony Deppenschmidt along with a write-in challenge from his former mistress, Delgado. Gallegos won handily with over 90% of the votes.

In July 2005, Gallegos was again named one of the worst legislators in Texas by Texas Monthly.  Nevertheless, Gallegos was sworn in as Governor for one day on May 5, 2007, in a Texas tradition honoring the Senate President Pro Tem.

Personal life
Gallegos attended the University of Houston–Downtown (UHD) where he received a Bachelor of Arts degree in social sciences in 2001.

On March 10, 2006, Gallegos released a statement acknowledging that he was in a one-month residential treatment program for his alcoholism. On January 11, 2007, Gallegos announced that he was suffering from cirrhosis of the liver, and would require a liver transplant, and on January 19, 2007, Gallegos received a liver transplant at the Texas Medical Center in Houston. His liver donor was 16-year-old Robby Joe Trevino Jr. of Fort Worth, Texas who died unexpectedly from cardiomyopathy. According to a statement from Gallegos prior to the surgery, he would miss about 18 days of the regular session of the 80th Legislature.

Gallegos installed a hospital bed in the office of the sergeant-at-arms at the capitol building so that he could be nearby to prevent discussion of a bill requiring voter identification, against doctors' orders.

In October 2012 Gallegos was hospitalized and later died.

Electoral history

2004

2002

1998

1994

1992

See also

 History of the Mexican-Americans in Houston
 Ninfa Laurenzo
 Rick Noriega
 Ben Reyes
 South Park Mexican
 Felix Tijerina

References

External links
Senate of Texas - Senator Mario Gallegos Jr.
Project Vote Smart - Senator Mario V. Gallegos Jr (TX) profile
Follow the Money - Mario Gallegos Jr
2006 2004 2002 1998 campaign contributions

Democratic Party Texas state senators
Democratic Party members of the Texas House of Representatives
1950 births
2012 deaths
American politicians of Mexican descent
Hispanic and Latino American state legislators in Texas
People from Harris County, Texas
Presidents pro tempore of the Texas Senate
University of Houston–Downtown alumni
People from Houston
Liver transplant recipients
21st-century American politicians